"X Lives and Deaths of Wolverine" is a comic book storyline published by Marvel Comics, running from January to March 2022. With the focus being on Wolverine, the story takes place between the Reign of X and Destiny of X relaunches. The storyline also ties into Volume 7 of the main Wolverine title.

Conception
Being divided into two sets of five issues, the story is written by Benjamin Percy, with X Lives artwork provided by Joshua Cassara and X Deaths artwork Federico Vicentini. The color for the miniseries is being separately provided by Frank Martin and Federico Blee.

Plot
The plot marks the beginning of the Second Krakoa Age, with Wolverine traveling in time to save the life of an important figure to the mutant race, the professor Charles Xavier. In the midst of his travels, Wolverine will relive certain moments from his own long-forgotten past as well. At some point, it is revealed that Wolverine was present during the birth of Charles Xavier and indirectly Cassandra Nova, having saved his family from an invading Omega Red, when the Russian mutant possessed some of Xavier family's butlers and nurse. It is revealed that Omega Red's plan is assassinate Xavier, which would prevent the formation of the X-Men.

Series

Collected edition

References

Marvel Comics storylines
Storylines in comics
2022 in comics
Wolverine (comics) titles